Henriette Dessaulles (February 6, 1860 – November 17, 1946), also known by the pen name Fadette, was a Canadian journalist and diarist from Quebec. An important pioneer of women's writing in Quebec, she is best known for her longtime column in Le Devoir and for her childhood diaries which were posthumously published in 1971.

She was born in Saint-Hyacinthe, Quebec to Georges-Casimir Dessaulles, at the time the town's mayor and later a member of the Legislative Assembly of Quebec and the Senate of Canada, and Émilie Mondelet. Jean Dessaulles was her paternal grandfather, Dominique Mondelet was her maternal grandfather, and Louis-Joseph Papineau was her godfather.

Beginning at age 14, Dessaules began writing a diary in 1874 while being educated at convent school. She continued until 1881, when she married Maurice St-Jacques. She had seven children with St-Jacques before his death in 1897. At the time of St-Jacques' death, he was a Quebec Liberal Party candidate for the electoral district of Saint-Hyacinthe in the 1897 provincial election; Dessaulles' father was nominated in his place, and won the seat.

Journalism
After St-Jacques' death, Dessaulles began writing a column for La Patrie under the pseudonym Jean Deshayes. She also wrote for Le Journal de Françoise, Le Courrier de Montmagny, La Revue de la femme, La Revue moderne, Le Canada and Le Nationaliste before joining Le Devoir in 1910. For Le Devoir, she wrote a long-running column under the pen name Fadette. Compilations of her Fadette columns were published as Lettres de Fadette in 1914, 1915, 1916 and 1918, and she published several works of children's literature, including Les Contes de la lune (1932), and Il etait une fois (1933).

She continued writing the column in Le Devoir until the 1940s, and died November 17, 1946.

Diaries
Her childhood diaries were published in 1971 as Fadette: Journal d'Henriette Dessaulles 1874-1881. They attracted widespread attention, as both a portrait of the thoughts of a young girl and as a social history.

An English translation of the diaries by Liedewy Hawke was published in 1986 as Hopes and Dreams, The Diary of Henriette Dessaulles 1874-1881. Hawke won both the John Glassco Translation Prize and the Canada Council Translation Prize for her work.

References

External links

 Henriette Dessaulles' Journal on Bibliothèque mobile de littérature québécoise (HTML)

19th-century Canadian non-fiction writers
19th-century Canadian women writers
20th-century Canadian non-fiction writers
20th-century Canadian women writers
Canadian children's writers in French
Canadian diarists
Canadian columnists
Canadian women journalists
Canadian newspaper journalists
People from Saint-Hyacinthe
Writers from Quebec
Canadian non-fiction writers in French
1860 births
1946 deaths
Pseudonymous women writers
Canadian women non-fiction writers
Women diarists
Canadian women columnists
19th-century pseudonymous writers
20th-century pseudonymous writers
Canadian women children's writers